Klára Bonyhádi (born November 27, 1955, in Orosháza) is a former Hungarian handball player and World Championship silver medalist.

In 1980 she was a member of the Hungarian team which finished fourth on the Olympics. She played three in matches of the tournament.

References

1955 births
Living people
People from Orosháza
Hungarian female handball players
Olympic handball players of Hungary
Handball players at the 1980 Summer Olympics
Sportspeople from Békés County